Gurjiu (also Romanized as Gūrjīū; also known as Kabūtar Haleh and Kaftar Ḩalah) is a village in Shaban Rural District, in the Central District of Nahavand County, Hamadan Province, Iran. At the 2006 census, its population was 51, in 13 families.

References 

Populated places in Nahavand County